Tršice is a municipality and village in Olomouc District in the Olomouc Region of the Czech Republic. It has about 1,800 inhabitants.

Administrative parts
Villages of Hostkovice, Lipňany, Přestavlky, Vacanovice and Zákřov are administrative parts of Tršice.

History
The first written mention of Tršice is from 1282. A Gothic fortress in Tršice was rebuilt into a Renaissance residence in 1568.

Many people in this village helped to hide a Jewish family each during World War II. Six of them were given the honorific title of Righteous Among the Nations.

References

Villages in Olomouc District
Holocaust locations in Czechoslovakia